The 2014 United Kingdom budget was delivered by George Osborne, the Chancellor of the Exchequer, to the House of Commons on Wednesday, 19 March 2014.

It was the fifth budget of the Conservative–Liberal Democrat coalition government formed after the 2010 general election, and also the fifth to be delivered by Osborne.

Taxes

Spending

References

External links
2014 United Kingdom budget at Gov.uk

United Kingdom
Budget
2014
United Kingdom budget
George Osborne